Anocha is a genus of midges in the family Cecidomyiidae. The eight described species are known from the holarctic region. The genus was first described by Arthur Earl Pritchard in 1948.

Species
Anocha celesteana Pritchard, 1960
Anocha glabra Jaschhof, 2017
Anocha grytsjoenensis Jaschhof, 2017
Anocha japonica Jaschhof, 2017
Anocha minuta (Jaschhof, 2009)
Anocha moraviensis Jaschhof, 2017
Anocha spinosa (Felt, 1913)
Anocha vernalis Jaschhof, 2017

References

Cecidomyiidae genera

Insects described in 1948
Taxa named by Arthur Earl Pritchard